Mthatha , alternatively rendered Umtata, is the main city of the King Sabata Dalindyebo Local Municipality in Eastern Cape province of South Africa and the capital of OR Tambo District Municipality. The city has an airport, previously known as the K. D. Matanzima Airport after former leader Kaiser Matanzima. Mthatha derives its name from the nearby Mthatha River which was named after the sneezewood (umtati) trees, famous for their wood and medicinal properties.

History 

The settlement existed in the 1870s as a buffer-zone, in response to reported tensions between Pondo and neighbouring Thembu groups, and in 1875 a magistrate's office was opened. The first magistrate, appointed that year, was a man named J F Boyes. The settlement developed during the next few years, becoming a military post for the British colonial forces in 1882. The town itself was founded in 1883, along the banks of the Mthatha River. Nearly a century later, the Mthatha Dam was constructed about eight kilometers upstream of the town. Mthatha became the leading administrative centre of the area, having both Anglican and Catholic cathedrals. The town became the headquarters of the Transkeian Territories General Council (known as the Bunga), and the building which served as a parliament was erected in 1903. This was followed by the construction of the town hall in 1908. A branch of the University of Fort Hare was established in the town, and after the independence of the Transkei in 1977 it became the University of Transkei. In 2005, the University of Transkei with the Border Technikon and Eastern Cape Technikon were merged to form the Walter Sisulu University for Technology and Science. The campus was the base for the region's first community radio station, UCRFM, which started in 1996 and has become a significant community broadcaster.

On 1 August 1973, Mthatha High Court was opened.

In 1973, a summit meeting of the black homeland leaders was held at Umtata, when they decided to federate their respective states after independence. In 1976, Transkei was granted independence as a bantustan, a nominally independent state not recognised outside South Africa. Mthatha served as the capital under the name "Umtata". Under the Transkei regime, an airport named after the then ruler of Transkei KD Matanzima was built. On 21 May 2012, the airport was formally handed over to Lindiwe Sisulu, then Minister of Defence, by Noxolo Kiviet, then Premier of the Eastern Cape. However, the South African National Defence Force relinquished its control of the airport in 2013. The airport was renamed Mthatha Airport.

After the end of apartheid, some sections of the African business and professional community migrated to traditionally white areas of economic activity, and this has been widely cited as a cause of economic recession in the municipality, but a number of construction projects offer hope for renewal. 

Many of South Africa's black leaders – including Walter Sisulu, Sabelo Phama, Bantu Holomisa and Nelson Mandela — come from this area, and the retired Mandela visited his home village of Qunu a few kilometres south of Mthatha.

Mthatha is a focal point of the Nelson Mandela Route which celebrates the life of Nelson Mandela. There are three Nelson Mandela Museums. Spread across three sites, they collect, interpret and exhibit key aspects of the story of the life and times of Nelson Mandela. The three historical sites of the museum are at Mvezo, Qunu and the Bunga Building in Mthatha itself. In the Bunga Building is the story of the Long Walk to Freedom and an exhibition of the many gifts received by Nelson Mandela. 

On 2 March 2004, Umtata was renamed "Mthatha".

Business

Mthatha has 2 major taxi businesses: Uncedo Taxi Association and Border Taxi Association. These associations had a feud over the R61 road from Mthatha to Libode and Port St. Johns. This feud resulted in taxi ranks being closed by the Government. Over 60 fatalities were reported during the period of the feud. In  2018, the Minister of Police Bheki Cele closed all taxi ranks in Mthatha and demanded that the taxi associations negotiate with the police and merge to form one association but they refused. As a result, some taxis were impounded by the police. Sagas ranks were opened in Mthatha but the ranks that were not opened triggered riots with people protesting and police firing rubber bullets and tear gas affecting a nearby school (St John's College).

In 2019, two final year students, from the Walter Sisulu University developed affordable prosthetics. These students, Siphosethu Mgwili and Zanodumo Godlimpi, were awarded the first ever WSU vice-chancellor's award for most innovative prototype.

Religion 
The city is the episcopal see of both the Roman Catholic Diocese of Mthatha and the Anglican Diocese of Mthatha.

Economy

Mthatha falls under OR Tambo District Municipality which is the poorest district in the Eastern Cape by all poverty measures. It has the lowest HDI (0.45) and the highest poverty gap (2 231 million) in the Eastern Cape. The number of people living in poverty is also high in this district (64.6%), unemployment is at 65.5% and the literacy rate 42.2%.

In 2006, it was reported the King Sabata Dalindyebo Local Municipality was owed R250 million by residents in unpaid service fees. It counts among its creditors the South African Revenue Service (to which it owes R18-million), the Public Investment Commission (R84 million), the national water affairs and forestry department (R46 million) and the Development Bank of Southern Africa (R13 million). According to SA Delivery, The average annual income of a black Mthatha resident is R15,762. The town has also been plagued by complaints about the state of its roads and the collapse of its utilities and infrastructure. It's widely reported that the general decline into dysfunction and societal fragility is caused by endemic political corruption, municipal incompetence and widespread criminality. Despite all that, a new dawn is beckoning for Mthatha with the construction of infrastructure like BT Ngebs Mall and Mayfair Hotel.

Notable people from Mthatha  

 Nelson Mandela
 King Buyelekhaya Dalindyebo "Aa! Zwelibanzi!", the King of the AbaThembu Kingdom.
 King Sabata Dalindyebo "Aa! Jonguhlanga!", the King of the AbaThembu Kingdom.
 Moneoa Moshesh 
 Amanda Black
 Lwazi Mvovo
 Odwa Ndungane
 Stella Ndabeni-Abrahams
 Akona Ndungane
 Alan Barrow
 Bongani Mayosi
 Nkosinathi Mankayi
 Bubele Mhlana
 Carlo Del Fava
 Jeff Hawkes
 Jessica Haines
 Masibusane Zongo
 Ngazibini Sigwili
 Odwa Ndungane
 Sean Park
 Siya Mdaka
 Vusumuzi Masondo
 Sabelo Phama
 Nambitha Mpumlwana
 Zola Nombona
 Jet Novuka
 IFani
 Busiswa
 Black Coffee
 Athi-Patra Ruga
 Kaneez Surka
 Jerry Masslo
 Wendy Woods

Climate 

Mthatha has a warm oceanic climate (Köppen Cfb) closely bordering on both a humid subtropical climate (Cfa) and a semi-arid climate (BSh/BSk).

See also
 Kei River
 Mthatha River
 Transkei

References 
news24.com article "mthatha has collapsed"

External links 

 Mthatha town website
The Ecological Health of the Mthatha River
 Can Mthatha turn the corner?

Populated places in the King Sabata Dalindyebo Local Municipality
Transkei
Capitals of former nations
Populated places established in 1876
1876 establishments in the Cape Colony